Government College of Commerce and Business Administration, Chandigarh also known as GCCBA Chandigarh is a constituent college of the Panjab University, located in Chandigarh, India. It is an initiative of the Chandigarh Administration. GCCBA was established with a view to cater to growing demand for commerce and management education in Chandigarh. Since its inception, the college is co-educational.

The Government College of Commerce and Business Administration (GCCBA) is the only college in Chandigarh that deals exclusively with the streams of commerce and management. Approval to start the college was granted by General (Retired) Sunith Francis Rodrigues, the then Governor of Punjab, and Administrator, UT Chandigarh in September 2006.

History
The Governor of  Punjab and Administrator of Union Territory of Chandigarh, General (Retd.) Sunith Francis Rodrigues, PVSM, VSM, accorded the approval for the start of the Government College of Commerce and Business Administration on 15 September 2006.

After grant of affiliation by Panjab University, the first academic session (2007–08) commenced with 185 students. Presently there are around 600 students on the rolls.

Campus
The institute shifted to its permanent campus in Sector 50 in October 2015.

Academics

Academic programmes 
GCCBA is affiliated with Panjab University and presently offers the following courses :

 Bachelor of Business Administration
 Bachelor of Commerce (Honours) in Business Finance, Accounting and E-Commerce
 Bachelor of Commerce (General)
 Master of Commerce

Awards and recognition
The institute was ranked Chandigarh's 2nd Best Commerce College in 2014 by India Today.

Placement and Career Guidance
Placement drives and career cell sessions are organised in campus on regular basis.

Student life

Cultural and Non-Academic Activities
Cultural and non academic activities like Dramatics, Public Speaking, Quizzing, Literary, Arts, Music and Sports also mark an important feature in the life of a student of GCCBA Chandigarh.

GCCBA students have won awards in many prestigious college, university, regional and national level competitions.

The annual Cultural, Management and IT Fest - YuvClique is held in the month of February.

Societies and Activities
 National Service Scheme (NSS)
 Management Club - GESTIONE 
 Environment Society - AVNI
 Literary Society
 Gender Sensitization Society
 Drugs Awareness Society
 I.T Society 
 Anti-Stress Society

See also
Education in India
Literacy in India
List of institutions of higher education in Punjab, India

References

External links

Courses, Fee & Admission Details (Chandigarh Metro)

Universities and colleges in Chandigarh